Balgandharva is a biographical Marathi film on one of the Marathi singers and stage actors Narayan Shripad Rajhans, famously known as Bal Gandharva (Bal=child + Gandharva=Singer of Heaven). The name was bestowed to Narayan by Lokmanya Tilak after listening to his public performance in Pune while he was very young.

The film is directed by Ravi Jadhav, whose debutant film Natarang won critical acclaims as well as good box office report. The film is produced by Nitin Chandrakant Desai, the National Award-winning Art Director, under the banner of Iconic Chandrakant Productions Pvt. Ltd.

The film was declared "Super Hit" at the box-office.

Plot

The film is a biopic on life on Balgandharva showing his struggles through poverty to riches and fame. Narayan Rajhans while in a public performance of his singing at Pune receives his new honour and name "Balgandharva". On advise of Shahu Maharaj, the king of Kolhapur state, he starts his formal training and joins Kirloskar Natak Mandali. Narayan wins claps of his audiences and becomes the key performer of all Sangeet Nataks. To please his insistent mother Narayan marries Laxmi. On the opening day (12 March 1911) of his play Sangeet Manapamaan, his infant daughter dies. But he goes ahead with the performance and enthralls the audience. Due to disputes in the company Narayan decides to start his own company named Gandharva Natak Mandali. Fully devoting himself towards his passion of drama and singing he overlooks his family. Giving audience's satisfaction key priority he starts spending money without any considerations. He loses many of his friends because of such attitude. He blindly believes in Balasaheb Pandit, who keeps his company's accounts. Narayan's carefree nature results in his bankruptcy. Meeting Gohar Bai, who is his fan, he falls in love with her and leaves his wife and family. With his old age, he also loses the charm of holding audiences. When cinema is introduced, theatre fails to grab  audiences. Balgandharva also signs contract with V. Shantaram's Prabhat Film Company to act in films. Money in films would also reduce his economic burden. But he never likes the methodologies of film production and abandons it after only one film where he plays the lead role of Sant Eknath. Looking at his poverty many Royalties pay him honorary amounts in order to repay his debts. But he in turn donates this money to other charities.

Cast
 Subodh Bhave  as Narayan Shripad Rajhans/ Bal Gandharva
 Suhas Joshi  as Narayan's mother
 Kishor Kadam  as Ganpatrao Bodas
 Avinash Narkar  as Balasaheb Pandit
 Sagar Talashikar as Nanasaheb Joglekar
 Anand Abhyankar  as Mama
 Vibhavari Deshpande  as Narayan's wife, Laxmi
 Prachiti Mhatre  as Gohar Bai Karnataki
 Abhijit Kelkar  as  Sadubhau Ranade
 Rahul Deshpande  as Keshavrao Bhosale (also known as Sangeet Surya)
 Rahul Solapurkar  as Shahu Maharaj
 Mukesh Rishi  as Pathan
 Manoj Kolhatkar  as Ram Ganesh Gadkari (Gadkari Mastar)
 Angad Mhaskar  as Anant Kanhere
 Atharva Karve  as young Balgandharva
 Vidyadhar Joshi  as Shankarrao
 Siddharth Chandekar  as Abhyankar
 Manoj Joshi  as Seth Laxmichand Narayan
 Madhav Abhyankar  as Pant from Bhor Province
 Nitin Chandrakant Desai  as Lokmanya Tilak

Production
The mahurat shot of the film was done at the Bal Gandharva Rang Mandir, Pune; the place whose foundation stone was laid by Balgandharva. As the story is based in early 20th century Maharashtra, renowned historian Babasaheb Purandare, famous theatre actress of the yesteryears, Jaimala Shiledar along with her daughter Kirti Shiledar and historian Dr. Jaisingrao Pawar helped in consulting for the production. Multiple National Award winning costume designer Neeta Lulla designed the costumes and jewellery of the characters to recreate the era.

The film premiered in Mumbai on 4 May 2011 and on 5 May in Pune. It then released all over Maharashtra on 6 May.

Awards and recognition
The film was screened at many film festivals around the globe, starting from the New York Indian Film Festival on 8 May 2011. Subsequently, it was also screened at the Cannes and Venice festivals.

The film also won maximum number of awards (3) at 59th National Film Awards in 2011.

National Film Awards
 2011: National Film Award for Best Male Playback Singer - Anand Bhate
Citation: For taking up the challenge of recreating the ethos of a doyen like Bal Gandharva who strode the musical stage like a giant. He recreates the magic of the sonorous voice of Bal Gandharva in a flawless and distinguished manner thus helping preserve a tradition. The original voice of the actor and his voice blend seamlessly.
 2011: National Film Award for Best Costume Design - Neeta Lulla (shared with Neharika Khan for The Dirty Picture)
Citation: For creating a period with appropriate costumes embellished with the right colors and textures. Neeta Lulla of 'Balgandharva' and Niharika Khan in 'The Dirty Picture’ have both done meticulous research into those times, not merely to be authentic but also to appropriately contextualize the respective narratives and their times.
 2011: National Film Award for Best Make-up Artist - Vikram Gaikwad (also for The Dirty Picture)
Citation: For bringing to life the primary characters who propel the two films. He has especially worked on the transformations of the two characters as they journey towards their tragic fate. The makeup lends authenticity and highlights their emotional frailties thus raising the film to another temporal level.

Soundtrack

The soundtrack of the film comprises 21 songs of which 16 feature in the film. The soundtrack was released on 25 April 2011 at a ceremony held at Rang Sharada Auditorium, Bandra.

Kaushal Inamdar is the music director of the film. To recreate the magic of Gandharva Music, the team invited Christian Howes, a Jazz Violinist to conduct the strings for "Nahi Me Bolat Natha", a legendary song of Bal Gandharva. The entire strings section was recorded by remote by Kaushal Inamdar from US and Spain. This is the first time the Marathi cinema has used a western artiste. Anand Bhate, also known as "Anand Gandharva", a Hindustani classical vocalist from Kirana Gharana has lent his voice for all songs for the lead character. Swanand Kirkire, the popular Hindi film lyricist known for his songs of Parineeta, 3 Idiots and Lage Raho Munna Bhai has penned lyrics of "Parvardigar", a  qawwali and "Aaj Mhare Ghar Pavana", a bhajan.

The music was mixed in Yash Raj Studio and mastered in London. The music is released by Saregama. Following is the list of the tracks.

 - Music recreated by Kaushal Inamdar

References

External links 
 
 

2011 films
Indian biographical drama films
2011 biographical drama films
Biographical films about entertainers
Indian musical drama films
Films that won the Best Costume Design National Film Award
Films that won the National Film Award for Best Make-up
Films directed by Ravi Jadhav
2010s Marathi-language films
2011 drama films